S. Ajaya Kumar (born 20 July 1964) is an Indian politician who was a member of the 11th, 12th, 13th and 14th Lok Sabha . He represented the Ottapalam constituency of Kerala and is a member of the Communist Party of India (Marxist).

References

External links
 Members of Fourteenth Lok Sabha - Parliament of India website

Communist Party of India (Marxist) politicians from Kerala
Living people
1964 births
India MPs 2004–2009
India MPs 1996–1997
India MPs 1998–1999
India MPs 1999–2004
Lok Sabha members from Kerala